Shawn Elliott (born June 26, 1973) is an American college football coach and former player. He is the head football coach at Georgia State University, a position he has held since the 2017 season. Elliott served as the interim head football coach at the University of South Carolina for the final six games of the 2015 season. He joined the South Carolina Gamecocks football coaching staff in 2010 as the team's running game coordinator under Steve Spurrier. He was later named the co-offensive coordinator and offensive line coach. A day after South Carolina head coach Spurrier's resignation, Elliott was elevated to the position of head coach on an interim basis.

Coaching career
After graduating from Appalachian State University in 1996, Elliott joined the team's coaching staff under Jerry Moore. He was part of a staff that led the Mountaineers to three straight NCAA Division I Football Championships, from 2005 to 2007. He remained with the team until after the 2009 season, when he joined the staff of South Carolina.

On December 8, 2016, it was announced that Elliott accepted the head coaching position at Georgia State.

Personal life
A native of Camden, South Carolina, Elliott is married to Summer. They have two children.

Head coaching record

Notes

References

External links
 Georgia State profile

1973 births
Living people
American football defensive ends
Appalachian State Mountaineers football coaches
Appalachian State Mountaineers football players
Georgia State Panthers football coaches
South Carolina Gamecocks football coaches
People from Camden, South Carolina